Harry Clyde Ingles (March 12, 1888 – August 15, 1976) was a United States Army major general, who served during World War II and commanded the United States Army Signal Corps.

Early years

Harry C. Ingles was born on March 12, 1888, in Pleasant Hill, Nebraska, as the son of John William and Martha Ingles. After attending the high school at Lincoln, Ingles enrolled at the University of Nebraska, where he studied electrical engineering.

He was admitted at the United States Military Academy at West Point, New York, in 1910.  He graduated on June 12, 1914, and was commissioned a second lieutenant in the infantry branch. Ingles was assigned to the 4th Infantry at Fort Lawton, Washington.

Many of his classmates became later general officers, including Carl A. Spaatz, Brehon B. Somervell, Frank W. Milburn, Harold R. Bull, John B. Anderson, Jens A. Doe, Orlando Ward, James L. Bradley, Vicente Lim, Ralph Royce, Harold Francis Loomis and Charles P. Gross.

Ingles saw service on the Mexican border during the Pancho Villa Expedition. During World War I, Ingles was appointed a commander of the military and technical training of Signal Corps officers and transferred to the Signal Corps in 1920 at his own request.

Between the wars, Ingles served on the various military assignments, including signal officer of the Philippine Division, instructor in communication at the Command and general staff College at Fort Leavenworth, Kansas, commander of the Army Signal Corps School, signal officer of the Third U.S. Army or signal officer of the Caribbean Defense Command.

World War II

During 1942, Ingles was appointed the chief of staff of the Caribbean Defense Command, where he served under the command of Lieutenant General Frank M. Andrews. Ingles was appointed commanding general of the Panama Mobile Force in the same year. He served in this capacity until 1943 and was decorated with the Army Distinguished Service Medal for his service.

In 1943, Major General Ingles served a brief period as a deputy commander in chief of the U.S. European Theater of Operations and on July 1, 1943, he succeeded Major General Dawson Olmstead as a Chief Signal Officer of the U.S. Army.

Under his tenure, the Signal Corps grew into an important part of the American war effort. After the war, the Signal Corps kept abreast of new technology and made first radar contact with the Earth's Moon during Project Diana and broke a speed record for fastest radioteletype in April 1945.

Postwar life

For his service during the World War II, Ingles received an Oak Leaf Cluster to his Army Distinguished Service Medal. Major general Harry C. Ingles retired from the Army in 1947 and subsequently was appointed a president of RCA Global Communications. He worked in this capacity from 1947 to 1953. He then worked for the National Broadcasting Company until 1969.

Ingles died at the age of 88 on August 15, 1976, in Bethesda, Maryland. He is buried together with his wife Grace Salisbury Ingles (1889–1977) at Arlington National Cemetery, Virginia.

Decorations

Here is the ribbon bar of Major General Ingles:

See also

References

1888 births
1976 deaths
United States Army Signal Corps personnel
United States Army Infantry Branch personnel
Military personnel from Nebraska
People from Saline County, Nebraska
University of Nebraska alumni
United States Military Academy alumni
United States Army Command and General Staff College alumni
United States Army War College alumni
United States Army personnel of World War I
Burials at Arlington National Cemetery
Recipients of the Distinguished Service Medal (US Army)
Officiers of the Légion d'honneur
Chief Signal Officer, U.S. Army
United States Army generals of World War II
United States Army generals